Daniel Irvine (born 13 February 1982) is an Australian former professional rugby league footballer who played in the 2000s. He played in the National Rugby League for Australian clubs, the Parramatta Eels, Canterbury-Bankstown and South Sydney.

Background
Nephew of Australian Rugby League Great Ken Irvine, Irvine attended Parramatta Marist High and was selected to play for the Australian Schoolboys team in 1999.

Playing career
Irvine formerly played for the Parramatta Eels then Canterbury-Bankstown and is commonly known by the nickname of Bubsy.  Irvine signed a 2-year contract with South Sydney for 2007/2008 season.

Coaching career
Irvine went on to coach the South Sydney Toyota Cup team for the 2008/09 seasons.

Personal life
He is now a chiropractor at Irvine Chiropractic servicing the Parramatta, Northmead, Winston Hills, Merrylands, Greystanes, Oatlands areas and the surrounds.

References

1982 births
Australian rugby league coaches
Australian rugby league players
Parramatta Eels players
Canterbury-Bankstown Bulldogs players
North Sydney Bears NSW Cup players
South Sydney Rabbitohs players
Rugby league hookers
Living people
Rugby league players from Sydney